Shai Hills Resource Reserve is a resource reserve located in Doryumu in the Shai Osudoku District all in the Greater Accra Region. It is along the Tema - Akosombo High way.

History 
It was made a Game Production Reserve in 1971. The protected area was home to the Shai people before they were ejected by the  British in 1892, remains of Shai peoples works can still be found at the reserve.

Recreation 
The Reserve has been a host to recreational activities such as Picnics, and in 2017 hosted the National Biking & Abseil Festival.
The area is of the best tourism hubs in Ghana.

Events 
Events held at Shai Hills resource reserve has been home to these events:

Location 
Shai Hills Resource Reserve is located along the Tema–Akosombo road.

Threats 
The reserve is bedeviled with a lot of threats such as danger from speeding vehicles because some of the baboons find their way to the highway. The reserve is also situated close to a stone quarry and this also affects the day-to-day activities of the park.

Touring 
The Shai Hills Resource Reserve is covered with grassland and low dry forest vegetation. There are nearly 400 plant species spread on the 5 separate hills at the Shai Hills Resource Reserve. There are nearly dozens of primary animal species including antelopes, bats, birds (such as violet Turaco, Paradise Flycatcher, Green Turaco Red-billed Hornbill, Yellow-fronted Tinkerbird, and Red-necked Buzzard), baboons, cats, duiker, guinea fowls, kobs, green monkeys, monitor lizards, African python, royal python, and zebras.

Visits 
Visitors can visit the attractive region of hilly rocks and grassy plains reserve all year round. Touring the reserve during the early rainy season (May through July) could be difficult because of the rough road condition. Popular activities include game viewing, bird watching, nature walking, and rock climbing.

References 

Protected areas of Ghana